The British Arab Commercial Bank PLC (BACB) is an international wholesale bank incorporated in the United Kingdom that is authorised by the Prudential Regulation Authority (PRA) and regulated by the PRA and the Financial Conduct Authority (FCA). It was founded in 1972 as UBAF Limited, adopted its current name in 1996, and registered as a public limited company in 2009. The bank has clients trading in and out of developing markets in the Middle East and Africa.

BACB has a head office in London, and three representative offices in Algiers in Algeria, Tripoli in Libya and Abidjan in the Cote D'Ivoire. The bank has 17 sister banks across Europe, Asia and Africa. It is owned by three main shareholders - the Libyan Foreign Bank (87.80%), Banque Centrale Populaire (6.10%) and Banque Extérieure d'Algérie (6.10%).

The bank provides services of trade finance, commodity finance, lending and structured finance, treasury, real estate lending, banking and payment services, and asset distribution and syndication. The current Chairman is Michael Stevenson, and the current Chief Executive Officer is Eddie Norton.

History

Origins

The bank was founded in 1972 as UBAF Limited and changed its name to UBAF Bank Limited in 1977.  It began as an affiliate of Midland Bank, and became an affiliate of HSBC when HSBC took over Midland Bank in 1992. The bank adopted the name British Arab Commercial Bank in 1996.

Since 2009
In 2009, Commercial Bank of Egypt sold its 8% stake. At the time, the other shareholders were HSBC (49%), Libyan Foreign Bank (26%), Bank Al-Maghrib (8%), and Banque Extérieure d’Algérie (8%). Banque Centrale Populaire eventually bought out Bank Al-Maghrib and thus gained a stake in BACB.

In 2010, HSBC sold its 49% shareholding to the Libyan Foreign Bank ("LFB"), a subsidiary of the Central Bank of Libya ("CBL").  Its share is 87.80%, with the other shareholders being Banque Centrale Populaire (6.10%), and Banque Extérieure d’Algérie (6.10%). On 2 June 2009, the Bank changed its corporate status from that of a private to a public company.

In 2016, the bank opened new representative offices in Dubai, and Abidjan, to add to its existing representative offices in Algiers, and in Tripoli.

Operating area

Africa
BACB aims to facilitate cross-border trade through a sustainable revenue base with its chosen clients and markets. The bank is known for dealing with markets with which larger banks are often hesitant to do business, such as Middle Eastern and North African markets. The bank serves the rest of the African continent through relationships with a number of financial institutions and correspondent banks, particularly in Nigeria and Ghana.

Most notably, the bank works with Saf Cacao in Cote D'Ivoire, and Casablanca-based steel company Acier Longofer in Morocco, becoming the first commercial bank to fund the latter.

Europe
While the majority of the bank's clients are African and Middle Eastern companies and institutions, working with them brings it into regular contact with European exporters and importers. The bank also has sister banks in European countries, including Spain, Italy and France.

Financial performance
After a shaky performance over the preceding few years, BACB regained a stable position in 2016, and made a profit of £2.6 million before tax deductions. The bank's total assets also came to £2.9 billion that same year. The successful financial year also included an 11% increase in operating income to £42.7 million.

See also

SABB

References 

 http://africanbusinessmagazine.com/african-banker/british-arab-commercial-bank-bets-trade-finance/

HSBC acquisitions
Banks based in the City of London
1972 establishments in the United Kingdom
Banks established in 1972
Arab organizations